Ball is the third studio album by the rock band Iron Butterfly, released on January 17, 1969. After the enormous success of In-A-Gadda-Da-Vida, Iron Butterfly modified its acid-rock sound somewhat and experimented with more melodic compositions. The band's trademark heavy guitars, however, are still evident on such tracks as "In the Time of Our Lives" and "It Must Be Love". The album reached number 3 on the Billboard 200 charts, making Ball more immediately successful than In-A-Gadda-Da-Vida. Ball was certified Gold in March 1969. It also spawned two minor hit singles: "Soul Experience", an uncharacteristically uplifting song for the group, went to number 75 on the Billboard charts, and despite its nightmarish musical tones and morbid lyrics, "In the Time of Our Lives" managed to reach number 96. This is the second and final studio album to feature the famous lineup of Ingle, Bushy, Dorman and Brann.

In 1999, Collector's Choice Music released Ball with two bonus tracks, "I Can't Help But Deceive You Little Girl" and "To Be Alone", which were both recorded during the same era as Ball (although not necessarily during the same recording sessions) and were previously released as the two sides of a 7" single. "I Can't Help But Deceive You Little Girl" had also been released on the 1993 compilation Light & Heavy: The Best of Iron Butterfly.

Reception

AllMusic rated Ball three out of five stars. Reviewer Stephen Thomas Erlewine explained that the quality "is wildly inconsistent", but that it "was a more ambitious album" than In-A-Gadda-Da-Vida. He concluded by calling it "a more consistent album than their two previous records".

Track listing

Side one
 "In the Time of Our Lives" (Doug Ingle, Ron Bushy) – 4:49
 "Soul Experience" (Ingle, Bushy, Erik Brann, Lee Dorman) – 2:50
 "Lonely Boy" (Ingle) – 4:57
 "Real Fright" (Ingle, Bushy, Brann) – 2:40
 "In the Crowds" (Ingle, Dorman) – 2:10

Side two
 "It Must Be Love" (Ingle) – 4:23
 "Her Favorite Style" (Ingle) – 3:13
 "Filled with Fear" (Ingle) – 3:46
 "Belda-Beast" (Brann) – 5:46

1999 CD reissue bonus tracks
 "I Can't Help but Deceive You Little Girl" (Ingle) – 3:34
 "To Be Alone" (Ingle, Robert Woods Edmondson) – 3:05

Personnel

Iron Butterfly
Erik Brann – guitars, backing vocals, lead vocals on "Belda-Beast"
Doug Ingle – organs, lead vocals (except on "Belda-Beast")
Lee Dorman – bass, backing vocals
Ron Bushy – drums, percussion

Technical
 Jim Hilton – producer, engineer
 Joel Brodsky – photography

Certifications

Singles

US and overseas singles
 "Soul Experience" b/w "In the Crowds" (No. 75 on the Billboard Hot 100)
 "In the Time of Our Lives" b/w "It Must Be Love" (No. 96 on the Billboard Hot 100)

UK-only singles
 "Belda-Beast" (4:59 edit) b/w "Lonely Boy"

Post-album singles
 "I Can't Help but Deceive You Little Girl" b/w "To Be Alone"

Notes

References

1969 albums
Iron Butterfly albums
Atco Records albums
Collectors' Choice Music albums
Albums recorded at Gold Star Studios